Carrington is a lunar impact crater that is located just to the northeast of the crater Schumacher, in the northeastern part of the near side of the Moon. It lies in a stretch of rough terrain between two small lunar maria, with Lacus Temporis to the northwest and the smaller Lacus Spei to the east. To the northeast of Carrington is Mercurius.

The rim of Carrington is relatively featureless, with a slight protrusion at the northern end giving the formation a tear-drop shape. The interior floor is nearly level and featureless.

References

 
 
 
 
 
 
 
 
 
 
 
 

Impact craters on the Moon